Karbonn Mobiles is an Indian smartphone manufacturing company, founded in March 2009. It is a vendor of feature phones, smartphones, tablets and mobile phone accessories.
Karbonn is a joint venture between United Telelinks Ltd., a Bangalore-based firm and Jaina Marketing Pvt. Ltd., headquartered in New Delhi. Karbonn Mobiles also has tie ups with leading telecom players like Airtel, Vodafone Idea and Jio.
Karbonn now widely operates in countries such as Bangladesh, Nepal, Sri Lanka, UAE, Oman, Saudi Arabia, Qatar, Bahrain, Yemen, United Kingdom and parts of Europe.

History 

The company struck a deal with Eros International Media Ltd., the makers of Rajinikanth-starrer film Kochadaiyaan (2013). The deal involved the manufacture of five lakh (500,000) items of Kochadaiyaan merchandise with screen savers and images from the film, the trailer, behind-the-scenes shots, the signature tune of the film, and the lead actor's signature on back cover of phones.

Karbonn ties with online digital entertainment service provider Hungama.com and have an app preinstalled.

In October 2012, Karbonn announced the launch of their brand extension 'Karbonn Smart'. The range includes a smart tab and smartphones based on Android operating system. In February 2014, Microsoft announced Karbonn as a hardware partner of Windows Phone operating system.

Karbonn Sparkle V is one of the initial Android One phones manufactured by Karbonn Mobiles in cooperation with Google Inc.

Brand 
Karbonn was ranked the 77th most trusted brand in India among 1,200, by The Brand Trust Report 2014, a study conducted by brand analytics company Trust Research Advisory. In the 2017 edition of the report, it stands at the 350th position among 1,000 Indian companies surveyed.

Karbonn is the first Android One phone to be sold in the Europe : Karbonn Sparkle V2. The company entered the UK market through Amazon.co.uk

In 2019, Karbonn acquired former chinese mobile giants Gionee after they went bankrupt and control all of its operations worldwide. In 2020 they announced Gionee Mobile as a sub-brand of Karbonn.

In March 2022, Karbonn announced that it would undergo liquidations as the company have been facing a severe revenue decline due to the pandemic.

Revenue

The firm's total investment in the Indian consumer market was over US$5 million in the year 2011. The firm contracted with semiconductor companies for their handsets and targets mainly the Indian market. The firm has over 85,000 retailers and 1000+ service centers (150+ dedicated exclusively for Karbonn) across India. Karbonn Mobiles aims at registering a turnover of ₹4,000 crore during the 2013-14 financial year.

References

External links
 Official website

Mobile phone companies of India
Mobile phone manufacturers
Indian brands
Indian companies established in 2009
Mobile phone industry in India
Manufacturing companies based in Delhi
Electronics companies established in 2009
2009 establishments in Delhi